The Djinba are an Aboriginal Australian group of the Yolngu people of the Northern Territory.

Name
Their endonym Djinba comes from their word for the demonstrative pronoun 'this'.
The two moieties are (a) Ganalbingu (Ganhalpuyngu) and (b) Mandjalpingu (Manydjalpuyngu).

Language
Djinba is one of the Yolŋu languages, and its closest relationship is to Djinang with which it is about 60% cognate.

Country
The Djinang lie to their north-west, the Rembarrnga directly west, while to their south were the Ngandi and Diakui people (Ritharrngu) tribes.

Social organisation
Norman Tindale claimed that the Djinba were the most northerly tribe in eastern Arnhem Land to retain the standard Australian tribal structure, meaning they were divided into Dua and Jiritja clans.

Alternative names
 Jinba.
 Outjanbah.

Notable people 
 David Gulpilil

Notes

Citations

Sources

Yolngu